This is the list of Nemzeti Bajnokság I top scorers season by season. The latest top scorer of the Nemzeti Bajnokság I is Andre Alves of Videoton FC.

 
Hungary
Association football player non-biographical articles